Bob Vance may refer to:

 Bob Vance (fictional character), character from The Office
 Leon Vance (1916–1944), American soldier
 Bob Vance (jurist) (born 1961), American jurist who ran for Alabama Supreme Court in 2012, son of assassinated judge Robert S. Vance
 Bob Vance (cricketer) (1924–1994), New Zealand cricketer and cricket administrator

See also
 Robert Vance (disambiguation)